Sherpathri is one of the Block in District Ganderbal, Jammu and Kashmir, India. It was formed in 2014 by the J&K Govt and is located at a distance of 5 km from the main town. There are total of 7 Blocks in Ganderbal District. Sherpathri Consists of 5 Halqas viz; Gogjigund, Sehpora, Rabitar, Shallabugh and Hakim Gund. Mr. Rafeeq Ahmad Wani is currently the Naib Tehsildar Sherpathri

Famous Destination
Asia's Largest Wetland is located in the Shallabugh Village of Sherpathri Block. Every year large number of migratory birds from different countries visit the wetland.

Geography 

The famous Sonamarg hill station is at a distance of 70 km from here. The Sind River, a major tributary to the Jehlum River flows through Sherpathri. The sand (bajri) of this river has a great value for money for its quality.

Demographics 

The population of Block Sherpathri is 51355 Males constitute 52% of the total population while female constitute 48% of the total population.
The total geographical area of this Block is 25.42 km2. Agriculture is the mainstay of the population. Urdu is the official language here, people also speak their native language (Kashmiri) as well as English (both of which are also official, as well as Hindi).

Climate
Sherpathri has a humid subtropical climate (Köppen Cfa). The valley is surrounded by the Himalayas on all sides. Moderate to heavy snowfall occurs in winter and the highway connecting Kashmir with the rest of India faces frequent blockades due to icy roads and avalanches. Spring is the wettest season while autumn is the driest.

See also
Ganderbal
Gogjigund
Sind
Wakura

References

Kashmir
Villages in Ganderbal district